Spidia is a genus of moths belonging to the subfamily Drepaninae.

Species
Spidia excentrica Strand, 1912
Spidia fenestrata Butler, 1878
Spidia goniata Watson, 1957
Spidia inangulata Watson, 1965
Spidia miserrima (Holland, 1893)
Spidia planola Watson, 1965
Spidia rufinota Watson, 1965
Spidia smithi (Warren, 1902)
Spidia subviridis (Warren, 1899)

References

Drepaninae
Drepanidae genera